The 1997 WTA German Open was a women's tennis tournament played on outdoor clay courts at the Rot-Weiss Tennis Club in Berlin, Germany that was part of the Tier I category of the 1997 WTA Tour. It was the 28th edition of the tournament and was held from 12 May through 18 May 1997. Tenth-seeded Mary Joe Fernández won the singles title.

Finals

Singles

 Mary Joe Fernández defeated  Mary Pierce 6–4, 6–2
 It was Fernández's 1st singles title of the year and the 7th of her career.

Doubles

 Lindsay Davenport /  Jana Novotná defeated  Gigi Fernández /  Natasha Zvereva 6–2, 3–6, 6–2
 It was Davenport's 7th title of the year and the 25th of her career. It was Novotná's 3rd title of the year and the 79th of her career.

External links
 ITF tournament edition details
 Tournament draws

WTA German Open
WTA German Open
1997 in German tennis